The white-crested tyrannulet (Serpophaga subcristata) is a small species of bird in the family Tyrannidae. It is found in woodland and open habitats with scatted bushes and trees in Argentina, Bolivia, Brazil, Paraguay, and Uruguay. It is closely related to the white-bellied tyrannulet, but unlike that species the belly of the white-crested tyrannulet is yellow. The recently described Straneck's tyrannulet is extremely similar to the white-crested tyrannulet and was for a long time confused with that species; the two are generally best separated by voice.

References

white-crested tyrannulet
Birds of South America
white-crested tyrannulet
Taxa named by Louis Jean Pierre Vieillot
Taxonomy articles created by Polbot